Petrishchevo is a rural locality (a village) in Sukhonskoye Rural Settlement, Mezhdurechensky District, Vologda Oblast, Russia. The population was 10 as of 2002.

Geography 
Petrishchevo is located 15 km southwest of Shuyskoye (the district's administrative centre) by road. Vakhrushevo is the nearest rural locality.

References 

Rural localities in Mezhdurechensky District, Vologda Oblast